Ciales is a town and municipality of Puerto Rico, located on the Central Mountain Range, northwest of Orocovis; south of Florida and Manatí; east of Utuado and Jayuya; and west of Morovis. Ciales is spread over eight barrios and Ciales Pueblo (the downtown area and the administrative center of the city). It is part of the San Juan-Caguas-Guaynabo Metropolitan Statistical Area.

Toponym 
Sources diverge on the origin of the Ciales name. Nineteenth-century historian Cayetano Coll y Toste stated that it was named as such by then-governor Gonzalo de Aróstegui Herrera in honor of General Luis de Lacy, who had gone against Ferdinand VII's absolutist wishes. Coll y Toste suggested that the Villa Lacy name came from the anagram "es-la-cy" anagram.

Other sources, such as Manuel Álvarez Nazario and Luis Hernández Aquino, put forward the theory that it comes from the plural of cibales, plural form of ciba, meaning "stony place" or "place of stones" in Taíno, which "had undergone loss of the intervocalic -b- and the addition of the Spanish suffix referring to place -al." Lisa Cathleen Green-Douglass, who carried out a study of toponymics in Puerto Rico and compared both theories, believed the latter to be most plausible since Coll y Toste, per Green-Douglass, must have defined an anagram as a reversal of syllables and the resulting "Cial" or "Cyal" would have to then be made plural.

Yet others believe it originates from the Spanish sillar (meaning "carved stones") in reference to the stones carved by the Río Grande de Manatí's currents.

History
 
Until its founding on June 24, 1820, by Isidro Rodríguez, it was part of  the neighboring Manatí municipality, a process that took four years to achieve.

On 13 August 1898, after the armstice ending the Spanish–American War was signed, Ciales was one of three towns that held uprisings. Lead by Ventura Casellas, between three hundred and four hundred individuals proclaimed the Republic of Puerto Rico. However, it has not been determined without a shadow of a doubt whether it was a clear independence-supporting event or a defense of Spanish rule. Edwin Karli Padilla Aponte calls it an "alleged revolutionary uprising" since he finds no official historical record for it, even though it appears in a vignette in the Pueblos Hispanos monthly written by a Gabriel Aracelis, a possible pseudonym for Juan Antonio Corretjer. The column describes the battle, mentions the participants by name and connects it to the Grito de Lares by identifying a Pedro González as a grandson of a Manuel González who allegedly fought in the 1868 revolt, establishing a continuity between both events. Paul G. Miller, Education Commissioner between 1915 and 1921, considered this to be caused by the Seditious Parties (Partidas Sediciosas), gangs of bandits that raided Spaniards' homes in the late-nineteenth century, an idea that Corretjer refuted.

Puerto Rico was ceded by Spain in the aftermath of the Spanish–American War under the terms of the Treaty of Paris of 1898 and became a territory of the United States. In 1899, the United States Department of War conducted a census of Puerto Rico finding that the population of Ciales was 18,115.

The first truss bridge erected in Puerto Rico, after the signing of the Treaty of Paris, is in Ciales. It is over the Río Grande de Manatí and is on the list of National Register of Historic Places.

Hurricane Maria struck Puerto Rico on September 20, 2017, its eye passing through northeastern Ciales, leaving all municipalities without power for months. Ciales received 19.23 inches of rain which caused landslides. An estimated 3,000 homes in Ciales were completely destroyed by Hurricane María. Three months after the hurricane struck, engineers were hoping to have electrical service established, at least for the Ciales barrio-pueblo (downtown) area. The following December, the Federal Emergency Management Agency announced the opening of a disaster recovery center in Ciales to attend the home and business owners, as well as tenants, affected by the hurricane.

Energy consortium
An Energy Consortium was signed in late February, 2019 by Villalba, Orocovis, Morovis, Ciales and Barranquitas municipalities. The consortium is the first of its kind for the island. It is intended to have municipalities work together to safeguard and create resilient, and efficient energy networks, with backups for their communities. This is part of the hurricane preparedness plan of these municipalities, which were hit particularly hard by Hurricane Maria on September 20, 2017.

Geography

The northern part of the municipality is located in the Northern Karst zone of Puerto Rico while the southern part is in the Cordillera Central. The highest point in the municipality is Cerro Rosa at 4,143 feet (1,262 m), itself the third highest point in Puerto Rico. Ciales is home to a forest reserve called Toro Negro Forest Reserve and a number of rivers including: Río Cialitos, Río Grande de Manatí, Río Toro Negro, Río Yunes, Pozas, and Barbas. Over 40% of its territory falls within protected areas, ranking as the 6th municipality with the largest portion of protected territory overall. Consequentially, the destruction of 508 native planted trees at the Finca Don Ingenio in the Toro Negro Forest Reserve in August 2021 was caused for an uproar. The trees, which included ceiba and maga specimens, had been planted as part of the Hurricane María recovery by the Puerto Rico Conservation Trust's Para La Naturaleza program.

As part of the karst region, there are many caves, such as Archillas Cave, located in Jaguas Ventana, named after the family that owns it. Since Ciales has a saying "to graduate as a Cialeño, you have to go up to the Archillas," then-mayor Luis R. Maldonado Rodriguez attempted to acquire it. The cave has been associated with the Arcaicos, though it also holds some Taíno petroglyphs. The cave system was first studied by Alphonse L. Pinart in 1890. Since then several investigations have been carried out that have aided in the identification of silex as the main material used by the Taíno for their carving tools and the discovery of ceramic fragments, as well as the theory that the caves were used for rituals, such as cojoba-induced ceremonies. During his research in the early 1900s, Jesse Walter Fewkes identified the Ciales' caves as some those occupied by the Taíno as well as several of the best preserved sites with their stone-carved implements. One of these caves, La Cohoba Cave, was named after the namesake object found in it. Another notable find, carried out by Carlos M. Ayes Suárez, was of a zoomorphic idol from the Arcaico era in Pesas that "consists of a cobble that presents an engraved representation seemingly zoomorphic in shape" which is considered unique in Puerto Rico and the Antilles.

Due to the mountainous nature of Ciales' topography, landslides occur, such as the rock fall that occurred in June 2021 in Pozas that caused several buildings and fences to be destroyed, road closures and the removal of residents.

Barrios

Like all municipalities of Puerto Rico, Ciales is subdivided into barrios.

Ciales barrio-pueblo
 Cialitos
 Cordillera
 Frontón
 Hato Viejo
 Jaguas
 Pesas
 Pozas
 Toro Negro

Sectors

Barrios (which are like minor civil divisions) in turn are further subdivided into smaller local populated place areas/units called sectores (which means sectors in English). The types of sectores may vary, from sector to urbanización to reparto to barriada to residencial, among others.

Special Communities

 (Special Communities of Puerto Rico) are marginalized communities whose citizens are experiencing a certain amount of social exclusion. A map shows these communities occur in nearly every municipality of the commonwealth. Of the 742 places that were on the list in 2014, the following barrios, communities, sectors, or neighborhoods were in Ciales: Sector El Hoyo in Pozas, Calle Morovis, Comunidad Los Ortega, Cruces-Cialitos, Parcelas Cordillera, Parcelas María, Parcelas Seguí, Santa Clara, and Toro Negro.

Demographics

Ciales has one of the lowest percentages of English speakers in Puerto Rico.

When researching the town's parochial baptismal records historian Fernando Picó found that more than half the offspring baptised at the end of the nineteenth century were born out of wedlock.

Tourism

Landmarks and places of interest

Some places of interest in Ciales include:
, family-owned factory that produces widely recognized enea grass-weaved furniture
, located in Hato Viejo, it is the largest sawmill in Puerto Rico of native woods.
, environmental education coffee and cacao farm that also houses a printing museum and a batey.

Las Archillas Cave
Las Golondrinas Cave
Yuyú Cave
Parada Choferil
Toro Negro Forest Reserve
Chorro de Doña Juana
, a lookout
, houses the library of Juan Antonio Corretjer.
 , a coffee museum

Culture

Festivals and events
Ciales celebrates its patron saint festival in October. The  is a religious and cultural celebration that generally features parades, games, artisans, amusement rides, regional food, and live entertainment.

Other festivals and events celebrated in Ciales include:
 Three King's Day, held in January
 Corretjer Cantata, held in March
 Fresh Water Festival (in ), mud bogging competition and music festival held in August
 Frontón Festival, held in July
 Saint Elías Festival, held in July

Sports
Ciales is the home town of Juan "Pachín" Vicens - Puerto Rico's national basketball star, named Best Player in the World at the 1959 World Basketball Championship, Santiago de Chile (a.k.a., Juan "Pachín" Vicens, "Astro del Balón", "El Jeep"; younger brother of Puerto Rico's National Poet, Nimia Vicens, who also hailed from Ciales). Their middle brother, Enrique "Coco" Vicens, a former Puerto Rico Senator, was a track and field athlete in his own right.

Economy

Agriculture
The Ciales economy has always depended heavily on agriculture, especially coffee products, minor fruits (such as lettuce) and dairy production.

Government

All municipalities in Puerto Rico are administered by a mayor, elected every four years. The current mayor of Ciales is Alexander Burgos Otero, of the Progressive New Party (PNP) who had previously served in the municipal legislature and grandson of previous Ciales mayor, Roque Otero Cortés. He was elected at the 2020 general elections.

The city belongs to the Puerto Rico Senatorial district III, which is represented by two Senators. In 2008, José Emilio González Velázquez and Angel Martínez Santiago were elected as District Senators.

Symbols
The  has an official flag and coat of arms. On the 150th anniversary of the founding of Ciales, the flag and coat of arms were adopted with Resolution No. 13 Series 1969–1970, sanctioned by Don Ismael Nazario, who was mayor at the time.

Flag
The flag is divided into seven unequal stripes described in sequence: yellow, red, yellow, purple, yellow, red, and yellow.

Coat of arms
The coat of arms consists of a gold shield with a lion standing on its rear legs and silver-plated nails grasping a silver coiled parchment between its front claws. The lion also shows a red tongue. Above the lion in the superior part of the shield are located three heraldic roses arranged horizontally with red petals and green leaves. A golden crown of three towers rests on the shield. The three towers are united by walls, simulating masonry blocks. The shield is surrounded by a crown of coffee tree branches with their berries, all in natural colors.

Nicknames 

 Cohoba City for the discover of instruments used by the Taíno in the Cohoba ritual, whereby they inhaled the hallucinogenic powder extracted from the cojoba seeds.
 Town of the Brave for the high concentration of independence supports, such as Juan Antonio Corretjer, some of which participated in the Grito de Lares.
 Cradle of Poets due to it being the birthplace of several poets, such as Juan Antonio Corretjer and Nimia Vicéns, both considered Puerto Rico's national poets.
 Central Cordillera Gate owing to its geographic location on the Cordillera Central mountainous range.
 Switzerland of Puerto Rico on account of its "its similarity to European valleys with abundant vegetation," and the wooden houses that are located in them.

Transportation
There is a public transportation terminal in downtown Ciales. In addition, there are 18 bridges in Ciales, including the NRHP-listed Manatí Bridge at Mata de Plátano.

Notable people from Ciales
Armando Carlo Asencio Rosado-barril de bomba artisan.
Edwin Avilés - singer and part of the Los Pleneros de la Cresta quintet.
Ramón Barrios - Socialist Party delegate to the Constitutional Convention of Puerto Rico.
Juan Antonio Corretjer - Nationalist and poet, considered the National Poet of Puerto Rico.
Ángel de Jesús Sánchez - fifth Chief Justice of the Supreme Court of Puerto Rico.
Raúl Feliciano - basketball player and lawyer.
Ed Figueroa - MLB Baseball Player
Juan Figueroa - Former-president of Universal Health Care Foundation of Connecticut.
Antonio J. González - Puerto Rico Independence Party founder and gubernatorial candidate, Puerto Rican Union Party gubernatorial candidate, and UPRRP College of Social Sciences dean.
Jovino González Rodríguez - seven-time National Troubadour.
José Emilio González Velázquez - Politician
Luis Maldonado - Politician
Ángel Chayanne Martínez - Politician
 - Film director and scriptwriter.
 - Poet and writer

Jorge Shamil Ocasio - Singer/song writer. Finalist on the third season of Idol Puerto Rico and top 5 on Tengo Talento Mucho Talento season 15. Well know in Ciales as Jorgito el Niño Trovador. He is also cousin with Joseph, Joshuan and Jeyluix Ocasio from Pleneros de La Crssta 

Jeyluix Ocasio - singer and part of the Los Pleneros de la Cresta quintet, brother of Joshua and Joseph Ocasio.
Joshua Ocasio - singer and part of the Los Pleneros de la Cresta quintet, brother of Jeyluix and Joseph Ocasio.
Joseph Ocasio - singer and part of the Los Pleneros de la Cresta quintet, brother of Joshua and Jeyluix Ocasio.
Mercedes Otero - Politician
Jorge L. Porras Cruz - Educator and writer, Hispanic Studies department chair at the University of Puerto Rico, Río Piedras campus
 - Poet and writer
José L. Rivera - USMC, recipient of the Navy Cross
Gabriel Rodríguez Aguiló - Politician
Juan José Rodríguez Pérez - Politician
Hiram Rosado - Nationalist
Carlos Manuel Rosario - Activist
Luis Sánchez Morales - Politician
Adalberto Santiago - Salsa singer, Tony Vega's cousin.
Arturito Santiago Labrador - singer and restaurateur, highly recognized in the jíbaro music scene.
Arturo Santiago Guzmán - four-time National Troubadour, son of Arturito Santiago Labrador.
Lisvette M. Sanz González - singer and guitar player, part of the Hermanos Sanz duo.
Luis Sanz González - singer and cuatro player, part of the Hermanos Sanz duo.
Tony Vega - salsa singer, Adalberto Santiago's cousin.
Vanessa Vélez - Volleyball player.
Enrique "Coco" Vicéns - Basketball Player
Juan "Pachín" Vicéns - Basketball Player
Nimia Vicéns - poet, proclaimed Puerto Rico's national poet by Pedro Albizu Campos.

Gallery

See also

List of Puerto Ricans
History of Puerto Rico
Did you know-Puerto Rico?

Notes

References

External links
 Go To Ciales website
USGS detailed map of Ciales
NIDIS Ciales drought conditions

 
Municipalities of Puerto Rico
Populated places established in 1820
San Juan–Caguas–Guaynabo metropolitan area
Energy in Puerto Rico